William Richard Walling Jr. (October 6, 1904 - December 11, 1983) was an actor and portrait photographer for film studios  in the United States. He was the son of Will Walling and Effie née Bond Walling. He flew planes and invented the cam-action Walling Loom with Marie Walling, which he sold.

Filmography

Actor
Slaves of Beauty (1927) as Robert
Walking Back (1928) as Smoke Thatcher
The Companionate Marriage (1928) as Donald Moore
The Head of the Family (1928) as Charley Sullivan
Silks and Saddles (1929) as Johnny Spencer
Shanghai Rose (1929) as Gregor West

References

1904 births
1983 deaths